Ireneusz Omięcki (born 10 September 1958) is a Polish rowing coxswain. He competed in the men's coxed pair event at the 1988 Summer Olympics.

References

1958 births
Living people
Polish male rowers
Olympic rowers of Poland
Rowers at the 1988 Summer Olympics
Sportspeople from Szczecin
Coxswains (rowing)